Sybil Henley Jacobson, (b. July 21, 1881 in London, England, d. November 4, 1953 near Vancouver, British Columbia, Canada) was a Canadian painter. Her oil and watercolor paintings of prairie landscapes, portraits, and still life are in a traditional style. Her work is largely found in private collections, but is also found the major collections at Norman Mackenzie Art Gallery, Moose Jaw Art Museum and National Exhibition Centre, and Nutana Collegiate. In 1929 she was one of ten founding members of the Women's Art Association of Saskatchewan.

Family life 
Jacobson is the daughter of Edward and Lucy Atkinson. She has two sisters and a brother. She married Peter Henley in 1914, a sculptor she met in Paris, who died two years later. She immigrated to Saskatchewan to farm in 1912. Jacobson married Dr. Johann Sigurdir Jacobson in 1935 and he died a year later in 1936. They had two children together, Johanna born in 1919 and Jacob born in 1921. They lived in Moose Jaw, Lac Vert Nord, and Winnipeg before moving to Vancouver in 1936.

Education and career

Jacobson studied at the Hastings and St. Leonard's Municipal School of Science, at Lambeth School of Science and Art, and for three years at Royal Academy, all in London, England. While at the Royal Academy Schools, Jacobson studied under John Singer Sargent. During her years of study she was also under the direction of Sir Lawrence Alma-Tadema, Sir George Clausen, Ernest Crofts, Sir Frank Dicksee and other masters. Jacobson worked as an art teacher in Saskatoon in 1925, Lac Vert Nord, and at the Canadian Institute of Associated Arts, Vancouver,B.C. from 1937-38. She established a studio in Moose Jaw, Saskatchewan in 1932.

Group exhibitions 
1926: Memorial Art Gallery
1930: Moose Jaw Women's Art Association, Provincial Art Exhibition
1937-40: Vancouver Art Gallery Annual B.C. Artists' Exhibition
1940s: John Britnell Art Gallery
1945-46: Vancouver Art Gallery Annual B.C. Artists' Exhibition
1966: Mendel Art Gallery Nutana Collegiate Memorial Art Gallery Collection
1971: Norman Mackenzie Art Gallery Saskatchewan: Art and Artists

References

External links 
 Biography at Saskatchewan Network for Art Collecting
 “Journal of Canadian Art History / Annales d'Histoire De l'Art Canadien.” Journal of Canadian Art History / Annales d'Histoire De l'Art Canadien, vol. 9, no. 2, 1986, pp. 203–205. 
 “Sask Artist Wins Prize at Exhibition” StarPhoenix, 1930.
 

1881 births
1953 deaths
20th-century Canadian women artists
20th-century Canadian artists
Alumni of the Royal Academy Schools
Artists from London
Artists from Saskatchewan
British emigrants to Canada